The Order of Charlemagne is the only order and civil decoration issued by the Principality of Andorra.

History 
The Order of Charlemagne was created 7 December 2007 by the Minister of Culture Juli Minoves Triquell with the purpose to "reward the merits of those who have excelled in their field of work and who have made outstanding services to the Andorran State".

The name of the order was given to honour the figure of the founder of the Principality of Andorra, Emperor Charlemagne of the Franks, who granted sovereignty to the people of the "Valleys of Andorra" in gratitude for helping him fight the Saracens. Since then, Charlemagne has been a national symbol for the principality.

Organisation 
The Grand Master of the order is the prime minister of the Principality of Andorra, currently Xavier Espot Zamora. Grand Chancellor is the Minister of Culture, currently Sílvia Riva González.

The order is divided into four classes:
 Collar
 Grand Cross
 Commander
 Medal

Recipients in selection 
 José Luis Sampedro (2008)

See also
 Charlemagne

References 
 
 http://www.rtva.ad/noticia.aspx?id=43819

Orders, decorations, and medals of Andorra
Awards established in 2007
2007 establishments in Andorra